Investir was a French language monthly business magazine published in Paris, France, between 1974 and 2011.

History and profile
Investir was established in 1974. It was relaunched in 1988. The magazine had been published by Hachette Filipacchi until 2001 when it began to be published Quebecor World Inc. It was part of Groupe les Echos, publishing subsidiary of LVMH Moet Hennessy Louis Vuitton SA. It was published monthly by Investir Publications SA, and its headquarters was in Paris.

It provided in-depth analyses and practical tips for managing the assets to its readers and audience, including major companies in the country. The magazine founded Actionnaira which was a personal investment trade show and organized numerous trade-related events and activities.

Jacques Derouin was among the editors-in-chief of Investir who left the post in August 2005. He also held the same post for Investir Hebdo, a weekly sister magazine of Investir. On 5 February 2011 Investir merged with another business magazine, Journal des Finances, to form Investir-Le Journal des Finances.

Circulation
The circulation of Investir was 108,000 copies in 1994. In 1997 the magazine sold 100,000 copies. Its circulation became 190,000 copies in 1999. At the beginning of the 2000s Investir was one of three leading business magazines in France with higher circulation than the others.

During the period of 2007-2008 the circulation of Investir was 98,000 copies.

References

External links

1974 establishments in France
2011 disestablishments in France
Business magazines published in France
Defunct magazines published in France
French-language magazines
LVMH brands
Magazines established in 1974
Magazines disestablished in 2011
Magazines published in Paris
Monthly magazines published in France